The Choazil Islands, also known as the  Malandzamia Islands, are two small islands located off the shore of Mtsamboro, northern Mayotte in the Indian Ocean. To the northwest is the larger Chissioua Mtsamboro (widely known as Zamburu Island).  This stretch of water  is known as the Choazil Passage, part of the Mozambique Channel.

Coral reefs border all sides of the island except the southern. The western of the Choazil Islands is said to be 164 feet high.
 The soundings close to the reef surrounding Zamburu are reportedly from 10 to 15 fathoms.

References

Islands of Mayotte